The Quantum Vacuum: An Introduction to Quantum Electrodynamics is a physics textbook authored by Peter W. Milonni in 1993. The book provides a careful and thorough treatment of zero-point energy, spontaneous emission, the Casimir, van der Waals forces, Lamb shift and anomalous magnetic moment of the electron at a level of detail not found in other introductory texts to quantum electrodynamics.

The first chapter, Zero‐Point Energy in Early Quantum Theory, was originally published in 1991 in the American Journal of Physics.

In 2008 Milonni received the Max Born Award "For exceptional contributions to the fields of theoretical optics, laser physics and quantum mechanics, and for dissemination of scientific knowledge through authorship of a series of outstanding books".

References

Physics textbooks
Quantum electrodynamics
Quantum electronics
Electrodynamics
Quantum field theory